Willem Buys (1661–1749) was acting Grand Pensionary of Holland in 1745 and 1746. He was pensionary of Amsterdam (1693–1725) and first secretary of the estates of Holland (1726–1749).

He had successes as negotiator of the United Provinces. He improved the diplomatic relationship with England in 1705 and 1706 and he was one of the Dutch negotiators during the peace negotiations in 1710 in Geertruidenberg and 1713 in Utrecht.

External links 
 

1661 births
1749 deaths
Fellows of the Royal Society
Grand Pensionaries
Leiden University alumni
Politicians from Amsterdam
Diplomats from Amsterdam